Four ships of the United States Navy have been named USS Omaha after the city of Omaha, Nebraska: 

 , an  commissioned in 1872; served in Atlantic and Asiatic Squadrons, scrapped in 1914
 , lead ship of the  light cruisers, commissioned in 1923; served during World War II, scrapped in 1946
 , a  commissioned in 1978; decommissioned in 1995, scrapped in 2012
 , an  commissioned in 2012

United States Navy ship names